Teror is a town and a municipality in the northern part of the island of Gran Canaria in the Province of Las Palmas in the Canary Islands. Its population is 12,671 (2013), and the town area is 25.70 km2.  Teror is situated in the mountains, 14 km southwest of Las Palmas city. September 8 is the local festivity celebrating Virgen del Pino (virgin of the pine, patron of the Gran Canaria).

Teror has a well preserved old town centre, which is under monument protection. There is a basilica, the quiet Virgin of the Pine Square in front of it, and neatly fronted buildings along the picturesque Calle Real de la Plaza street. After shepherds witnessed a Marian apparition nearby on 8 September 1481, Teror became the most important pilgrimage destination of the Canary Islands, and, as a result, rather prosperous. White houses with wooden balconies, where many of the island’s older families congregated, are typical of the town.

Mineral water is an important product of Teror. There's a weekly market (mercadillo) on Sundays.

See also
List of municipalities in Las Palmas

References

External links

 Discover Teror at grancanaria.com

Municipalities in Gran Canaria